Nativ ( – path), or officially Lishkat Hakesher or The Liaison Bureau, is an Israeli governmental liaison organization that maintained contact with Jews living in the Eastern Bloc during the Cold War and encouraged aliyah, immigration to Israel.

History
Founded as part of the Prime Minister's office by Prime Minister Moshe Sharett in 1952–1953, Nativ was designed to function covertly, making contacts, fostering Jewish education, and aiding immigration to Israel. Nativ was not the first organization to do this; Mossad Le'aliyah Bet, part of the Haganah, had brought Jews to Israel in defiance of the British Mandate, but this ended with the creation of Israel. Nativ was to continue that mission, except now in defiance of the Soviet Union. Although it operated in a clandestine manner, the official policy was never to break Soviet laws. This did not stop the KGB from suspecting that it was spying. In fact, as recently as 1998 Nativ was accused of conducting espionage operations. A former Israeli ambassador to Moscow claims that the KGB conducted exhaustive surveillance measures on all their operations, but never directly interfered.

Nativ began its foreign operations out of Israeli embassies, yet this ended after the Six-Day War, when Russia and fellow Soviet countries severed diplomatic ties with Israel. This led Nativ to focus more of its efforts on Western countries, where it lobbied governments to promote greater emigration freedom in the USSR with the phrase "Let My People Go". While its Soviet operations were stymied, the Refusenik movement began, bringing greater international attention to the Soviet emigration issue. Nativ assisted the movement by materially supporting the refuseniks and fostering refusenik organizations.

In the mid 1970s international pressure forced the Soviet Union to allow greater emigration, and the number of Soviet Jews leaving for Israel increased dramatically. The dissolution of the Soviet Union ended the need to conduct operations clandestinely, and today Lishkat Hakesher openly runs Jewish clubs and education services in Russia. It is also tasked with issuing visas and processing immigrants coming to Israel under the Law of Return. However, it has recently faced budget and personnel cuts, immigrant backlogs, and pressure to close from groups including the Mossad and Shin Bet. As of November 2006, Nativ had 60 employees and a budget of approximately 11.6 million USD.

When Kadima formed a coalition government with Yisrael Beiteinu, Nativ was moved from the Prime Minister's Office to the Ministry of Strategic Affairs. In February 2007, Avigdor Liberman, the Minister of Strategic Affairs and a Russian emigre, proposed that Lishkat Hakesher move into new operations among Russian Jews who emigrated to the United States, Canada, and Germany. Under Liberman's leadership, Nativ's Operation Germany attempted to convince ethnic Jewish immigrants from the former Soviet Union to emigrate from Germany to Israel. However, with his resignation in January 2008, plans of placing two Nativ employees in Germany are not likely to be carried out.

Organization

Head
As of 2005, the only requirements to lead Lishkat Hakesher were the ability to speak Russian and experience in managing bureaucracies. Headquartered in Tel Aviv, the director reports directly to the prime minister. All Nativ representatives in foreign countries report to the director, and are not responsible to the local diplomats. Representatives are supposed to inform the local ambassador of their activities, though failure to do this has caused tension in the past.

The prime minister has the power to directly appoint a new head, although in the last succession Prime Minister Ariel Sharon created a special committee, chaired by Secretary Yisrael Maimon, to recommend a replacement. The committee continued searching for a candidate under newly elected Prime Minister Ehud Olmert, finally selecting Naomi Ben-Ami, the Israeli ambassador to Ukraine.

List of leaders
 Shaul Avigur, 1953–1970
 Nehemiah Levanon, 1970–1980
 Yehuda Lapidot, 1980–1986
 David Bar-Tov, 1986–1992
 Yaakov Kedmi, 1992–1999
 Zvi Magen, 1999–2006
 Naomi Ben-Ami, 2006–2015
 Alex Kushnir, 2016–2017
 Neta Briskin-Peleg, 2017–present

Branches
 Information
 Activity
 Content

Notes

References
 Melman, Yossi. , Haaretz. Google cache version
 Melman, Yossi and Barkat, Amiram. From Russia with Jews", Haaretz, published Thursday, November 9, 2006
 Freedman, Robert O. Soviet Jewry in the 1980s. Duke University Press, 1989.  p. 77
 Levin, Aryeh. Envoy to Moscow: Memoirs of an Israeli Ambassador 1988-92. Routledge, 1996. 
 "Liaison Bureau, which played critical role in freeing Soviet Jews, celebrates 50 years"
 Sa'ar, Relly. "Immigrants to Israel caught in limbo waiting for approval", Haaretz. Accessed June 20, 2006.
  The Israeli Special Service "Nativ"

External links
 Lishkat Hakesher at The World
  "Government Bureau on communications with the Jewish communities"
  "Does Israel need Nativ"
 Educational website: Let My People Go – a free educational resource created by Israeli Prime Minister Office - Nativ, to keep the story of Soviet Jewry alive and to inspire the next generation.

Zionist organizations
Religious organizations based in Israel
Jewish outreach
Israel–Soviet Union relations
Israeli intelligence agencies
1952 establishments in Israel
Jewish organizations established in 1952